B. J. Marsh (February 21, 1940 – December 24, 2020) was an American politician from Missouri.

Biography
He was a member of the Missouri House of Representatives, serving from 1988 to 1992 and from 2000 to 2008. He was a member of the Republican Party. Marsh graduated from Weaver Airline Personnel School in 1960, and then he attended Southwest Missouri State University. He was the owner of Marsh Travel Agency and Motorcoach Tours and the commissioner of Missouri Tourism Commission in 2003.

Marsh died from complications of COVID-19 in Springfield, Missouri, on December 24, 2020, at age 80, during the COVID-19 pandemic in Missouri.

References

1940 births
2020 deaths
Republican Party members of the Missouri House of Representatives
Deaths from the COVID-19 pandemic in Missouri
People from Dade County, Missouri
Businesspeople from Missouri
Missouri State University alumni
20th-century American politicians
21st-century American politicians